The 1970 Delaware State Hornets football team represented Delaware State College—now known as Delaware State University—as a member of the Northern Division of the Central Intercollegiate Athletic Association (CIAA) in the 1970 NCAA College Division football season. Led by fourth-year head coach Arnold Jeter, the Hornets compiled an overall record of 6–2 and a mark of 4–1 in conference play, placing third in the CIAA's Northern Division. This was Delaware State’s final season competing in the CIAA, as they moved to the newly-formed Mid-Eastern Athletic Conference (MEAC) in 1971. Following the season, running back Steve Davis was selected with the 60th pick in the 1971 NFL Draft, becoming the first Hornet to be selected in an NFL Draft.

Schedule

References

Delaware State
Delaware State Hornets football seasons
Delaware State Hornets football